Tomorrow I'll Kill Myself (Spanish: Mañana me suicido) is a 1942 Argentine musical film directed by Carlos Schlieper and starring Amanda Ledesma, Alberto Vila and Osvaldo Miranda.

The film's sets were designed by the art director Juan Manuel Concado.

Cast
 Amanda Ledesma 
 Alberto Vila 
 Osvaldo Miranda 
 Héctor Quintanilla 
 Adrián Cuneo 
 Carlos Morganti 
 Billy Days 
 María Esther Álvarez 
 Elena Marcó
 Regina Laval 
 Chela Alvarado 
 Norma del Campo 
 Coralito Montes 
 Raquel Benítez

References

Bibliography 
 Abel Posadas. Carlos Schlieper. Centro Editor de América Latina, 1994.

External links 
 

1942 films
1942 musical films
Argentine musical films
1940s Spanish-language films
Films directed by Carlos Schlieper
Argentine black-and-white films
1940s Argentine films